Westpark Elementary School may refer to:

 Westpark Elementary School, administered by the Lester B. Pearson School Board in Dollard-des-Ormeaux, Quebec, Canada
 Westpark Elementary School, in the Irvine Unified School District in Irvine, California, US